Jordan Page (born 11 March 1987) is a former English rugby union player for Leeds Tykes, Worcester Warriors and Stourbridge.

References

1987 births
Living people
Sedgley Park R.U.F.C. players
Stourbridge R.F.C. players
Worcester Warriors players
Place of birth missing (living people)
21st-century English people